Ogg is an unincorporated community in Randall County, located in the U.S. state of Texas.

References

Unincorporated communities in Randall County, Texas
Unincorporated communities in Texas